Lu Dadong (1915 – 28 August 1998) was a communist revolutionary and politician of the People's Republic of China. He served as Communist Party Chief of Chongqing city and Governor of Sichuan province.

Biography
Lu Dadong was a native of Guantao County, Hebei province. He joined the communist revolution in 1937 and the Chinese Communist Party (CCP) in 1938.

In 1943 Lu studied at the Central Party School of the CCP in Yan'an. He was a commander of the People's Liberation Army during the Chinese Civil War and participated in numerous battles, including the Battle of Chengdu in Sichuan.

After the establishment of the People's Republic of China in 1949, Lu Dadong was appointed Communist Party Chief of Leshan prefecture in Sichuan. He was later transferred to Chongqing (then under the administration of Sichuan), rising to the position of First Party Secretary (party chief) of Chongqing (April 1974 – November 1981) and deputy party chief of Sichuan. From December 1979 to April 1983 he served as Governor of Sichuan.

Lu disappeared from public life in September 1989. He died on 28 August 1998 in Chengdu.

Lu was an alternate member of the 9th and 10th Central Committee of the Chinese Communist Party, and a full member of the 11th and 12th Central Committees.

References

1915 births
1998 deaths
Governors of Sichuan
Chinese Communist Party politicians from Hebei
People's Republic of China politicians from Hebei
Political office-holders in Chongqing
Mayors of Chongqing
Politicians from Handan